The Blackburn B.44  was a British single-engined fighter aircraft designed by Blackburn Aircraft in 1942. It was notable as a rare example of a flying boat fighter, featuring Blackburn's unique retractable hull, and designed to meet the requirements of Air Ministry Specification N.2/42.

Development 
After Japan's initial successes in the Pacific during World War II, the need for a fighter aircraft capable of operating from austere island sites with minimal infrastructure was regarded as a high priority.

N.2/42 called for a retractable-hull flying-boat fighter, and Blackburn decided to utilise as much of the structure of the Blackburn Firebrand as possible. The fuselage of the aircraft was to be split in two with the lower float-like half extending and retracting hydraulically.

The Napier Sabre engine was to have been in the nose of the upper fuselage half, and armament was to have been carried in the wings. The protracted development due to engine supply difficulties and serious control and stability shortcomings of the Firebrand, led to cancellation of the B.44. Further work on the flying boat fighter concept was carried out by Saunders-Roe, leading to the Saunders-Roe SR.A/1.

Specifications

See also

References

Notes

Bibliography

External links
 https://web.archive.org/web/20090527153939/http://freespace.virgin.net/john.dell/blackburn_b40.htm
 http://www.seawings.co.uk/images/photogallery/misc15.jpeg
 http://www.msacomputer.com/FlyingBoats-old/Blackburn-General/Blackburn-General.html 
 https://web.archive.org/web/20090609132412/http://freespace.virgin.net/john.dell/blackburn_b20.htm

1940s British fighter aircraft
Floatplanes
B-44
Single-engined tractor aircraft
Aircraft with contra-rotating propellers
Cancelled military aircraft projects of the United Kingdom
Mid-wing aircraft